Sematilide is an antiarrhythmic agent.

Sulfonamides
Antiarrhythmic agents
Benzamides
Diethylamino compounds